Chihuahua is one of the 67 municipalities of Chihuahua, in northern Mexico. The municipal seat is the city of Chihuahua, which is also the capital of the state of Chihuahua. 

As of 2010, the municipality had a total population of 819,543, up from 758,791 in 2005. It covers an area of 9219.30 km².

As of 2010, the city of Chihuahua had a population of 809,232, up from 748,551 in 2005.

Geography 

The municipality includes 888 localities, with the principal ones being:

References

Municipio de Chihuahua Enciclopedia de los municipios de México, INAFED

Municipalities of Chihuahua (state)
1821 establishments in Mexico